Valley High School (VHS) is a public high school in Lucasville, Ohio in Scioto County in Southern Ohio.  It is the only high school in the Valley Local School District. Their nickname is the Indians, and their colors are purple and gold.

Campus
The high school building is located on a large property adjacent to the Southern Ohio Correctional Facility.  The Valley Elementary School building sits on the same property northeast of the high school building.  The local Kiwanis group assisted in the setting up of playground equipment on the side of the elementary building.

Both the high school and elementary were built in 1992-1993 and were scheduled to begin holding classes after the Easter break in the spring of 1993.  However, a prisoner uprising on Easter Sunday at the Southern Ohio Correctional Facility, commonly referred to as the Lucasville Prison Riot, prevented the opening of the buildings.

The high school stadium which boasts a FieldTurf surface is immediately north of the high school building and finished construction prior to the start of the school year in 2000.  
The high school has tennis courts as well as five baseball/softball fields, three additional soccer fields, and two football fields used for local youth sports are also located on the property.  The high school baseball and softball stadiums are located on a nearby property.

Academics
Valley High School has an average graduating class size of 94 students, and the student teacher ratio is 16:1.  The number of students in grade 10 that were at or above proficiency standards exceeded the state average in all five subjects of the Ohio Graduation Test in 2011. Advance placement courses are offered in English literature and composition, U.S. government and politics, calculus, and chemistry.

Athletics
There are ten school districts and eleven high schools in Scioto County along with one parochial school as well several private and community schools.  The school's athletic affiliation is with the Ohio High School Athletic Association (OHSAA) and the Southern Ohio Conference (SOC), which has seventeen member schools and is divided into two divisions (SOC I & SOC II) based on the schools' enrollment. The SOC includes teams from four different Ohio counties - Jackson County (Oak Hill High School), Lawrence County (Saint Joseph Central High School and Symmes Valley High School), Pike County (Waverly High School, Eastern High School, and Western High School), and Scioto County (Clay High School, Green High School, Glenwood High School, Sciotoville Community School, Valley High School, Northwest High School, Minford High School, Portsmouth West High School, Notre Dame High School, South Webster High School, and Wheelersburg High School).

See also Ohio High School Athletic Conferences and the Southern Ohio Conference

Ohio High School Athletic Association championships and appearances
Boys' Baseball
OHSAA Division A Championship
1975 - defeated Russia 5-0
 2021- Final four Appearance, Division IV, defeated by Licolnview, 2-1
Girls' Softball
OHSAA Final Four Appearances
1993 - lost to North Robinson Colonel Crawford 9-3
1994 - lost to Jeromesville Hillsdale 6-1
Boys' Soccer
OHSAA Final Four Appearance
1998 - lost to Canal Fulton Northwest 7-2
Football 
2014 - Regional Champions. Lost to Kirtland 28-7 in State Semi Finals

Notable alumni
Gene Tenace - professional baseball player and coach, 6 time World Series Champion

References

External links
  Valley Local School District

High schools in Scioto County, Ohio
Public high schools in Ohio
Educational institutions established in 1887
1887 establishments in Ohio